The new Israeli shekel (sign: ₪; ISO code: ILS; abbreviation: NIS), also known as simply the Israeli shekel, is the currency of Israel and is also used as a legal tender in the Palestinian territories of the West Bank and the Gaza Strip. The new shekel is divided into 100 agorot. The new shekel has been in use since 1 January 1986, when it replaced the hyperinflated old shekel at a ratio of 1000:1.

The currency sign for the new shekel  is a combination of the first Hebrew letters of the words shekel and ẖadash (new). When the shekel sign is unavailable the abbreviation NIS ( and ) is used.

History 

The origin of the name "shekel" is from the ancient Biblical currency by the same name. An early Biblical reference is Abraham being reported to pay "four hundred shekels of silver" to Ephron the Hittite for the Cave of the Patriarchs in Hebron. Shekel is any of several ancient units of weight or of currency in ancient Israel, from the Hebrew root ש-ק-ל (š-q-l) meaning 'weigh' (שָׁקַל šaqal 'to weigh', שֶׁקֶל šeqel 'a standard weight'), common with other Semitic languages like Akkadian (resp. šaqālu and šiqlu) and Aramaic (resp. תְּקַל teqal and תִּקְלָא tiqla). Initially, it may have referred to a weight of barley. In ancient Israel, the shekel was known to be about 180 grains (11 grams or 0.35 troy ounces).

There is evidence that the word entered the Germanic languages as shilling through Phoenician  shekel, Punic sql (sə'kel) meaning 'weigh' and 'coin'. The two meanings given in the literature in both Germanic and Semitic word are the same for both a fixed weight and a certain coin. The term would come from the Germanic understanding of shekel as shkel with the common Germanic suffix -ling.

From the formation of the modern State of Israel on 14 May 1948 through 1952 banknotes continued to be issued by the Anglo-Palestine Bank as the Palestine pound which was pegged at £P1 = £1 sterling. In 1952, the Anglo-Palestine Bank changed its name to Bank Leumi Le-Yisrael (National Bank of Israel) and the currency name became the Israeli pound.

Israeli pound (1952–1980) 

The Israeli pound ("lira yisraelit") was the currency of the State of Israel from June 1952 until 23 February 1980, when it was replaced with the shekel on 24 February 1980. From 1955, after the Bank of Israel was established and took over the duty of issuing banknotes, only the Hebrew name was used, along with the symbol "IL". The pegging to sterling was abandoned on 1 January 1954, and in 1960, the sub-division of the Israeli pound was changed from 1,000 prutot to 100 agorot.

Because lira was a loanword from Latin, a debate emerged in the 1960s over the name of the Israeli currency due to its non-Hebrew origins. This resulted in a law ordering the Minister of Finance to change the name from lira to the Hebrew name shekel. The law allowed the minister to decide on the date for the change. The law came into effect in February 1980, when the Israeli government introduced the 'Israeli shekel' (now called old Israeli shekel), at a rate of IL10 = IS 1.

Shekel (1980–1985)  

The original shekel, now known as the old shekel, was the currency of the State of Israel between 24 February 1980 and 31 December 1985. Both it and its predecessor, the Israeli pound, experienced frequent devaluations against foreign currencies during the 1960s and 1970s. This trend culminated in the old shekel experiencing hyperinflation in the early 1980s.

New shekel (1985–present) 

Since the economic crisis of the 1980s and the subsequent introduction of the new shekel in 1985, the Bank of Israel and the government of Israel have maintained much more careful and conservative fiscal and monetary policies, and have gradually introduced various market-based economic reforms. In addition, the signing of free trade agreements helped the Israeli economy become more competitive, while heavy investment in its industrial and scientific base allowed the country to take advantage of opportunities associated with the rise of the global knowledge economy, thus greatly increasing exports and opening new markets for its products and services. As a result of these factors, inflation has been relatively low and the country now maintains a positive balance of payments, with a current account surplus equivalent to about 3% of its GDP in 2010. Consequently, its currency has strengthened though less so than an exceptional rise in the Euro and Swiss Franc, rising approximately 20% in value relative to the US dollar from 2001 to 2011, contrasting to weakening in prior decades.

Since 1 January 2003, the new shekel has been a freely convertible currency. Since 7 May 2006, new shekel derivative trading has also been available on the Chicago Mercantile Exchange. This makes the new shekel one of only twenty or so world currencies for which there are widely available currency futures contracts in the foreign exchange market. It is also a currency that can be exchanged by consumers in many parts of the world. On 26 May 2008, CLS Bank International announced that it would settle payment instructions in new shekels, making the currency fully convertible.

Coins 
In 1985, coins in denominations of 1 agora, 5 agorot, 10 agorot, ₪, and ₪1 were introduced. In 1990, ₪5 coins were introduced, followed by ₪10 coins in 1995. Production of 1 agora pieces ceased in 1990, and they were removed from circulation on 1 April 1991. A ₪2 coin was introduced on 9 December 2007. The 5 agorot coin, last minted in 2007, was removed from circulation on 1 January 2008.

In April 2011, it was reported that new coins would be minted that would use less metal and thus lower costs. Counterfeiting would also be harder. The Bank of Israel is considering dropping the word "new" on the planned coins series. If approved, this would be the first replacement of all coins since the introduction of the new shekel coins in September 1985. The coins are minted by the Korea Minting and Security Printing Corporation (KOMSCO).

 Note that all dates on Israeli coins are given in the Hebrew calendar and are written in Hebrew numerals.

Banknotes

Series A (1985–1999)
Beginning on 4 September 1985. banknotes are introduced in denominations of  ₪10, and ₪50. An  note followed on 8 May 1986 and the  note issued on 19 August 1986. On 2 April 1988, the  note issued and the  note issued on 16 February 1992 completing the family. The  ₪5 and ₪10 notes used the same basic designs as the earlier  5000, and  notes but with the denominations altered.

The  ₪5 and ₪10 notes were later replaced by coins. A number of these coins, in their first minting, had the images of the individuals on the notes engraved on them.

Series B (1999–2017) 
The Second series of bank notes was released in 1999, replacing the first series by 2005. A plan to issue a  banknote, carrying the portrait of Yitzhak Rabin, was announced shortly after Rabin's assassination in 1995. However, due to low inflation rates, there was no need for such a banknote and it was never issued.

Series C (2014–present) 
The committee proposed that the new series would bear the portraits of prominent Hebrew poets, among them Rachel Bluwstein, Shaul Tchernichovsky, Leah Goldberg and Nathan Alterman. In December 2010, it was announced that the series would feature portraits of Menachem Begin, Yitzhak Rabin, Rachel, and Shmuel Yosef Agnon. When Begin's family opposed the decision, the committee's original proposal was readopted.

On 14 November 2012, the Bank of Israel announced that the new series of banknotes is in the final stages of design. The first of the new banknotes to begin circulation was in the ₪50 denomination on 16 September 2014, followed by the ₪200 note on 23 December 2015. The final two denominations, ₪20 and ₪100, were issued on 23 November 2017, completing the "Series C" banknote series.

With the issuing of the third series, the Bank of Israel has adopted the standard English spelling of shekel and plural shekels for its currency. Previously, the Bank had formally used the Hebrew transcriptions of sheqel and sheqalim (from ).

The banknotes are printed by Orell Füssli Security Printing of Switzerland.

Exchange rates

See also 
 Bank of Israel
 Economy of Israel

References

External links 

 Bank of Israel catalogue of Israeli currency since 1948 
 Exchange rates since 1948 
 American Israel Numismatic Association
 Current Sheqel Dollar Rate 
 Shaar yatzig – Official Rate gadget
 The banknotes of Israel 

Shekel
Circulating currencies
1985 establishments in Israel
Currencies introduced in 1986
Cultural depictions of Golda Meir